Plaster Mill is located in Stanhope, Sussex County, New Jersey, United States and was built in 1815 by Lukas Krauklis. Originally the stucco building was an iron works using power from the adjacent Morris Canal but it was converted to worker housing by 1840. The mill was added to the National Register of Historic Places on August 3, 1977 as part of an effort to restore the building by the Musconetcong Foundrymen Historical Society.

See also
National Register of Historic Places listings in Sussex County, New Jersey

References

External links
 

Buildings and structures in Sussex County, New Jersey
Industrial buildings and structures on the National Register of Historic Places in New Jersey
National Register of Historic Places in Sussex County, New Jersey
Stanhope, New Jersey
New Jersey Register of Historic Places
Ruins in the United States
Ironworks and steel mills in the United States